Luiz Carlos Dórea Barreto (born March 7, 1965) is a boxing and mixed martial arts trainer from Brazil and is also a retired boxer. He trained many boxers like Acelino Freitas, Éverton Lopes and Adriana Araújo and mixed martial artists like Anderson Silva, Junior dos Santos, Antônio Rodrigo Nogueira and Antônio Rogério Nogueira.

Boxing and MMA training career

Early training camp and founding of Champion academy 
Dórea started as a trainer in 1988, after the decease of his boxing trainer. He decided to open a training camp on his garage, just for practicing. At 1990, he founded the academy Champion (Academia Champion/Champion Team). It began to grow over the years and quickly gained the fame of being the root to many of the greatest Brazilian boxers.

Trainer titles: Boxing and MMA world titles and olympic medal 
Dórea was the trainer of Acelino Freitas (Popó). He earned a Pan American silver medal in 1995 in Mar del Plata and won multiple titles in WBO and WBA between 1999 and 2006.

Dórea trains former UFC Middleweight Champion Anderson Silva since 2003. He trains also Junior dos Santos.

Dórea was the first trainer of Antônio Rodrigo Nogueira (Minotauro), but in 1994 he left to the United States to practice and teach Brazilian Jiu-Jitsu and was distant during the earning of his RINGS and Pride FC titles. Dórea asked to Nogueira come back to train with him only after 2002. Nogueira later won the UFC Interim Heavyweight Championship.

As a Nogueira's partner, Junior dos Santos (Cigano) was also trained by Dórea for all of his UFC bouts, including his victory over Cain Velasquez for the Heavyweight championship and all title defenses.

Dórea was also the boxing coach for Team dos Santos in The Ultimate Fighter: Team Lesnar vs. Team dos Santos, for Team Vitor in The Ultimate Fighter: Brazil and for Team Nogueira in The Ultimate Fighter: Brazil 2.

In the Olympic Games, Dórea was a Brazilian boxing coach for Athens 2004, Beijing 2008 and London 2012. Adriana Araújo, Dórea's student, earned a bronze medal in London 2012.

Other occupations 
Dórea is a civil police investigator and was a city councillor candidate for the city of Salvador in the Brazilian 2012 elections.

Boxing record

|- style="margin:0.5em auto; font-size:95%;"
| style="text-align:center;" colspan="8"|6 Wins (3 knockouts, 3 decisions), 2 Losses (2 knockouts), 1 Draw
|- style="text-align:center; margin:0.5em auto; font-size:95%; background:#e3e3e3;"
| style="border-style:none none solid solid; "|Res.
| style="border-style:none none solid solid; "|Record
| style="border-style:none none solid solid; "|Opponent
| style="border-style:none none solid solid; "|Type
| style="border-style:none none solid solid; "|Round
| style="border-style:none none solid solid; "|Date
| style="border-style:none none solid solid; "|Location
| style="border-style:none none solid solid; "|Notes
|- align=center
| Loss
|6–2–1
|align=left| Lester Ellis||align=left|TKO
|3 (10)
|1990-02-14
|align=left| Festival Hall, Melbourne, Victoria, Australia
|align=left|
|-align=center
| Loss
|6–1–1
|align=left| Salvatore Nardino||align=left|TKO
|6 (12)
|1989-10-28
|align=left| Fano, Marche, Italy
|align=left|For WBC International light welterweight title.
|-align=center
| Win
|6–0–1
|align=left|Alejandro Balsamo||align=left|PTS
|10
|1989-03-10
|align=left| Salvador, Bahia, Brazil
|align=left|
|-align=center
| Win
|5–0–1
|align=left| Domingo Guzman Nunez||align=left|TKO
|5 (12)
|1988-06-10
|align=left| Salvador, Bahia, Brazil
|align=left|Retained WBC International welterweight title.
|-align=center
| Win
|4–0–1
|align=left| Tony Jones||align=left|PTS
|12
|1988-02-26
|align=left| Salvador, Bahia, Brazil
|align=left|Won WBC International welterweight title.
|-align=center
| Win
|3–0–1
|align=left| Billy Wooten||align=left|TKO
|3 (10)
|1987-12-11
|align=left| Brazil
|align=left|
|-align=center
| Win
|2–0–1
|align=left| Alfredo Yvan Ayala||align=left|PTS
|10
|1987-10-08
|align=left| Salvador, Bahia, Brazil
|align=left|
|-align=center
| Win
|1–0–1
|align=left| Jesse Maciel||align=left|TKO
|10 (12)
|1987-08-14
|align=left| Brazil
|align=left|
|-align=center
| Draw
|0–0–1
|align=left| Francisco Mesquita Pereira||align=left|PTS
|6
|1986-12-07
|align=left| Hotel Quatro Rodas, Salvador, Bahia, Brazil
|align=left|
|-align=center

References

External links
 

1965 births
Living people
Sportspeople from Salvador, Bahia
Olympic coaches
Boxing trainers
Mixed martial arts trainers
Brazilian male boxers